The 2004 NatWest international was a one-off One Day International cricket match played between the Australia and Pakistan cricket teams at Lord's, London on 4 September 2004. The match was a warm-up fixture ahead of the 2004 ICC Champions Trophy.

Squads

Only ODI

References

External links
 Tour home at ESPNcricinfo
 NatWest International Match in England, Sep 2004 (Aus,Pak) at ESPNcricinfo archive
 

International cricket competitions in 2004
2004 in Australian cricket
2004 in English cricket
2004 in Pakistani cricket